The following is a list of all governors of Northern Samar, Philippines.

Politics of Northern Samar
Governors of Northern Samar
Governors of provinces of the Philippines